Lady Mary Butler (1689 – 2 January 1713) was the second daughter of the 2nd Duke of Ormonde and maternally a granddaughter of the 1st Duke of Beaufort. She was born at Kilkenny Castle in Ireland. She married John, 3rd Baron Ashburnham, on 21 October 1710, and died two years later in childbirth. She was Jonathan Swift’s "greatest favourite"; he wrote "I am in excessive concern for her death, I hardly knew a more valuable person on all accounts."

1689 births
1713 deaths
Mary
Daughters of British dukes
Deaths in childbirth
People from County Kilkenny
Ashburnham